Daniel Gómez may refer to:

 Daniel Gómez (entrepreneur), Mexican businessperson
 Daniel Gómez (fencer) (born 1990), Mexican fencer
 Daniel Gómez Carrero (born 1990), Spanish singer
 Daniel Gómez Rinaldi (born 1965), Argentine journalist and actor
 Daniel Gomez (footballer, born 1979), French footballer
 Dani Gómez (footballer, born 1992), Spanish footballer
 Dani Gómez (footballer, born 1998), Spanish footballer
 Daniel Gómez (water polo) (born 1948), Mexican Olympic water polo player